Dalpiazella brevicauda is an extinct prehistoric eel from the Lutetian of the Monte Bolca lagerstatten.  D. brevicauda and Paranguilla tigrina constitute the family Paranguilla.

See also

 Prehistoric fish
 List of prehistoric bony fish

References

External links 
 Bony fish in the online Sepkoski Database

Prehistoric ray-finned fish genera
Eocene fish
Fossils of Italy